The Armenian Women's Volleyball Championship is an annual competition of women 's volleyball teams of Armenia. It has been held since 1992 under the "spring-autumn" system. Teams from the unrecognized Nagorno-Karabakh Republic have also participated in a number of the tournament Editions. 
Since 2013 the championship is held under the name of the Women's National League and it is controlled by the Armenian Volleyball Federation.

Competition Formula
The Rule of The 2019 Championship consisted of two stages - preliminary and final. In the preliminary stage the teams had a two-round tournament. The top two teams played the championship in the final match, the 3rd and 4th plays for the bronze medals. Five teams played in the 2019 championship: KHMMMM (Yerevan), "Van" (Yerevan ), "Artsakh" (Stepanakert (Khankendi), unrecognized NKR), YPLH (Yerevan), "Avan" (Yerevan). 
The champion title was won for the 4th time in a row by the KHMOMM team, who defeated "Van" in the final 3:1. The 3rd place was taken by "Artsakh".

Past Champions

References

External links
 Volleyball Federation of Armenia official website
 Armenia Volleyball
   The Old Armenian Volleyball Federation

Armenian League
1992 establishments in Armenia
Volleyball in Armenia
Armenian League